The 2022 Indian Wells Masters (branded as the 2022 BNP Paribas Open for sponsorship reasons) was a professional men's and women's tennis tournament played in Indian Wells, California. It was the 48th edition of the men's event and 33rd of the women's event and was classified as an ATP Tour Masters 1000 event on the 2022 ATP Tour and a WTA 1000 event on the 2022 WTA Tour. Both the men's and the women's qualifying and main draw events took place from March 7 through March 20, 2022 on outdoor hard courts at the Indian Wells Tennis Garden. It was returned to its traditional March schedule for the first time since 2019 after the previous tournament was held five months earlier in October 2021 due to the COVID-19 pandemic.

Cameron Norrie was the defending men's singles champion, but he lost in the quarterfinals to Carlos Alcaraz. Taylor Fritz defeated Rafael Nadal in the final to win his first ATP Masters 1000 title, making him the first American to win at Indian Wells since Andre Agassi in 2001. Paula Badosa was the defending women's singles champion, but she lost in the semifinals to Maria Sakkari. Iga Świątek defeated Sakkari in the final to win her first Indian Wells title and her second consecutive WTA 1000 title of the year, making her the first Polish player to win at Indian Wells.

John Peers and Filip Polášek were the defending men's doubles champions, but they lost in the first round to Marcelo Arévalo and Jean-Julien Rojer. John Isner and Jack Sock defeated Santiago González and Édouard Roger-Vasselin in the final to win their second Indian Wells doubles title together after winning their first in 2018. Hsieh Su-wei and Elise Mertens were the defending women's doubles champions, but only Mertens returned to compete. She partnered with Veronika Kudermetova, but lost in the first round to Eri Hozumi and Makoto Ninomiya. Xu Yifan and Yang Zhaoxuan defeated Asia Muhammad and Ena Shibahara in the final to win their first WTA 1000 doubles title and become the first Chinese champions at Indian Wells since Peng Shuai in 2014.

Champions

Men's singles 

  Taylor Fritz def.  Rafael Nadal, 6–3, 7–6(7–5)

This was Fritz's first ATP Tour singles title of the year, and second overall. This was his first title at ATP Masters 1000 level.

Women's singles 

  Iga Świątek def.  Maria Sakkari, 6–4, 6–1.

This was Świątek's second WTA title of the year, and her fifth overall.

Men's doubles 

  John Isner /  Jack Sock def.  Santiago González /  Édouard Roger-Vasselin, 7–6(7–4), 6–3

Women's doubles 

  Xu Yifan /  Yang Zhaoxuan def.  Asia Muhammad /  Ena Shibahara, 7–5, 7–6(7–4)

Points and prize money

Point distribution

* Players with byes receive first round points.

Prize money
The prize money for the 2022 BNP Paribas Open was $17,168,110 (ATP: $8,584,055, WTA $8,584,055). All prize money is in US Dollars.

*

See also 

 2022 ATP Tour
 ATP Tour Masters 1000
 List of ATP Tour top-level tournament singles champions
 Tennis Masters Series records and statistics

 2022 WTA Tour
 WTA 1000 tournaments
 WTA Premier Mandatory/5
 List of WTA Tour top-level tournament singles champions

References

External links

 
2022 BNP Paribas Open
2022 ATP Tour
2022 WTA Tour
2022 in American tennis
March 2022 sports events in the United States
2022 in sports in California